The Seven Ravens is a German stop motion-animated fairy tale film directed by the Diehl brothers. It was released in Germany on 2 December 1937. The film is notable for being an animated feature film based on a Grimms' fairy tales story which premiered only a few weeks before Walt Disney's Snow White and the Seven Dwarfs. In that respect it is often cited as one of the first animated feature films.

Plot
The plot is based on the fairy tale of the same name which was written by the Brothers Grimm.

See also
 List of stop-motion films
 List of animated feature-length films

Sources

External links
 
 
  (contains some incorrect information)

1937 films
1937 animated films
1930s children's fantasy films
German black-and-white films
Films based on Grimms' Fairy Tales
Films of Nazi Germany
German animated films
German children's fantasy films
1930s German-language films
1930s stop-motion animated films
Animated feature films
Films about birds
Films based on fairy tales
1930s German films